Hooshyar is a surname. Notable people with the surname include:

Bahram Hooshyar (1938–1991), Iranian Air Force officer
Hossein Hooshyar (born 1986), Iranian footballer